The Marvel Super Heroes is an American animated television series starring five comic book superheroes from Marvel Comics. The first TV series based on Marvel characters, it debuted in syndication on U.S. television in 1966.

Produced by Grantray-Lawrence Animation, headed by Grant Simmons, Ray Patterson, and Robert Lawrence, it was an umbrella series of five segments, each approximately seven minutes long, broadcast on local television stations that aired the show at different times.  The series ran initially as a half-hour program made up of three seven-minute segments of a single superhero, separated by a short description of one of the other four heroes. It has also been broadcast as a mixture of various heroes in a half-hour timeslot, and as individual segments as filler or within a children's TV program.

The segments were "Captain America", "The Incredible Hulk", "Iron Man", "The Mighty Thor" and "The Sub-Mariner".

Production
Sixty-five half-hour episodes of three seven-minute chapters were produced, for a total of 195 segments that ran initially in broadcast syndication from September to December 1966.

The series, produced in color, had extremely limited animation produced by xerography, consisting of photocopied images taken directly from the comics and manipulated to minimize the need for animation production. The cartoons were presented as a series of static comic-strip panel images; generally the only movement involved the lips when a character spoke, the eyes, and the occasional arm or leg, or a fully animated black silhouette. The series used the original stories largely in their entirety, showcasing Jack Kirby, Steve Ditko and Don Heck art, among others, from the period fans and historians call the Silver Age of comic books.

Stan Lee, Marvel's editor and art director at the time, said in 2004 that he believed publisher Martin Goodman negotiated the deal with Grantray-Lawrence and that Lawrence chose the characters to be used. Lawrence rented Lee and his wife a penthouse apartment at 30 East 60th Street, near Madison Avenue, for Lee's use while he worked on the series. (Lee lived in Hewlett Harbor, New York, on Long Island, at the time.) Lee recalled, "I really don't remember any reaction from the Marvel artists involved. I wish I could claim to have written the [theme song] lyrics, because I think they're brilliant, but alas, I didn't". The songs were written by Jacques Urbont. In the meantime, Steve Krantz (who was distributing the series), made a deal to subcontract production of The Mighty Thor segments to Paramount Cartoon Studios (the animation division of Paramount Pictures, formerly known as Famous Studios), headed at that time by Fleischer Studios veteran Shamus Culhane.

Marvel announced the series in the "Marvel Bullpen Bulletins" of the November 1966 issues, stating in that monthly fan page's hyperbolic style that, "It won't be long before our swingin' super-heroes [sic] make their star-studded debut on TV, appearing five nights a week — that's right, five — count 'em — five nights a week, for a half-hour each night. So you've just got time to make sure your set's in good working order — check your local paper for time and station — and prepare to have a ball!"

Cast

Regular (credited) voice providers
 Len Carlson - Quicksilver, Loki, Odin, Nathan Garrett / Black Knight, Mad Thinker, President, Morgan Stark, Moon Man
 Bernard Cowan - Narrator, Melter, Captain Torak, Morgan, Ringmaster, Sando / Colonel Von Kranz
 Jack Creley - Donald Blake / Thor
 Max Ferguson - Bruce Banner / The Hulk
 Vita Linder - Lady Dorma, Jane Foster, Scarlet Witch, Sharon Carter, Peggy Carter, Lorelei, Celia Rawlings, Neri, Hippolyta
 Don Mason - Rick Jones
 Claude Rae - Thaddeus "Thunderbolt" Ross, Zeus, Seidring
 Henry Ramer - Major Uberhart, Doctor Doom, Wolfgang, Vashti, Mandarin
 John Vernon - Tony Stark / Iron Man, Prince Namor, the Sub-Mariner, Major Glenn Talbot, Major Corey
 Chris Wiggins - Clint Barton / Hawkeye, Kraven, Grey Gargoyle, Byrrah, Balder, Professor Shapanka / Jack Frost, Professor X, Count Nefaria, Happy Hogan's grandfather

Semi-regular and guest (uncredited) voice providers
 Carl Banas - Bucky Barnes
 Sandy Becker - Steve Rogers / Captain America
 Len Birman - Hercules, Giant-Man
 Vern Chapman - Edwin Jarvis, Super-Adaptoid
 Henry Comor - Gargantus, Calvin Zabo / Mister Hyde, Executioner
 Rod Coneybeare - Zarrko, Cobra
 Peg Dixon
 Gillie Fenwick - Baron Heinrich Zemo, Radioactive Man, Leader, Batroc the Leaper, Space Phantom, Dr. Cedric Rawlings, Heimdall, Sandu, Premiere Pouldu
 Margaret Griffin - Pepper Potts, Black Widow, Countess de la Spirosa, Enchantress
 Tom Harvey - Harold "Happy" Hogan, Iceman, Chameleon, Crusher Creel / Absorbing Man, Super-Skrull, Anton Vanko / Crimson Dynamo, Borok, Edam
 Paul Kligman - Red Skull, Warlord Krang, Mole Man, Metal Master, Power Man
 Douglas Master - Senator Harrington Boyd
 Ed McNamara - Swordsman, Titanium Man, Boomerang
 Maxine Miller - Betty Ross
 Mona O'Hearn - Wasp
 Billie Mae Richards - Newsboy

For WNAC-TV in Boston, Arthur Pierce portrayed Captain America in live-action segments for the show. Actors portraying other characters, including Dr. Doom, Hulk, and Bucky, also appeared in live-action segments. The segments were scripted by Superman co-creator Jerry Siegel.

Guest characters
Appearing in guest roles were:
 The X-Men — The original lineup of the Angel, the Beast, Cyclops, Iceman, and Marvel Girl appeared in a Sub-Mariner episode, "Dr. Doom's Day / The Doomed Allegiance / Tug of Death". The story was an adaptation of Fantastic Four #6 (Sept. 1962) and Fantastic Four Annual #3 (1965) but since Grantray-Lawrence Animation did not own rights to the Fantastic Four, the producers substituted the X-Men — although referring to them instead as "Allies for Peace". However, the characters retained their original designs and individual names from the comics.
 The Avengers — Episode 8 of The Incredible Hulk was an adaptation of Avengers #2 (Nov. 1963), and co-starred Thor, Iron Man (with his early golden armor recolored to match the red-and-gold design featured in the Iron Man episodes), Giant-Man, the Wasp. The lineup beginning in Avengers #4 (March 1964), with Thor, Iron Man, Giant-Man, the Wasp and the newly installed Captain America, appears in several Captain America episodes, as does the later line-up from Avengers #16 with Hawkeye, Quicksilver, and the Scarlet Witch.

Episodes

Each episode consisted of three chapters.

Captain America

 Episode 1: The Origin of Captain America, Wreckers Among Us, Enter Red Skull
 Episode 2: The Sentinel and the Spy, The Fantastic Origin of the Red Skull, Lest Tyranny Triumph
 Episode 3: Midnight in Greymoor Castle, If This Be Treason, When You Lie Down With Dogs
 Episode 4: The Return of Captain America, The Search, To Live Again
 Episode 5: Zemo and the Masters of Evil, Zemo Strikes, The Fury of Zemo
 Episode 6: The Revenge of Captain America, The Trap Is Sprung, So Dies A Villain
 Episode 7: Let The Past Be Gone, The Adaptoid, The Super Adaptoid
 Episode 8: The Coming of the Swordsman, Vengeance Is Ours, Emissary of Destruction
 Episode 9: The Bitter Taste of Defeat, Sorcery Triumph, The Road Back
 Episode 10: Doorway to Doom, When the Commissar Commands, Duel Or Die
 Episode 11: The Sleeper Shall Awake, Where Walks the Sleeper, The Final Sleep
 Episode 12: The Girl from Cap's Past, The Stage Is Set, 30 Minutes to Live
 Episode 13: The Red Skull Lives, He Who Holds the Cosmic Cube, The Red Skull Supreme

The Incredible Hulk

 Episode 1: The Origin of the Hulk, Enter the Gorgon, To Be a Man
 Episode 2: Terror of the Toadmen, Bruce Banner: Wanted For Treason, Hulk Runs Amok
 Episode 3: A Titan Rides the Train, The Horde of Humanoids, On the Rampage!
 Episode 4: The Power of Dr. Banner, Where Strides the Behemoth, Back from the Dead
 Episode 5: Micro Monsters, The Lair of the Leader, To Live Again
 Episode 6: Brawn Against Brain, Captured At Last, Enter the Chameleon
 Episode 7: Within this Monster Dwells a Man, Another World, Another Foe, The Wisdom of the Watcher
 Episode 8: The Space Phantom, Sting of the Wasp, Exit the Hulk
 Episode 9: The Incredible Hulk vs. Metal Master, The Master Tests His Metal, Mind Over Metal
 Episode 10: The Ringmaster, Captive of the Circus, The Grand Finale
 Episode 11: Enter Tyrannus, Beauty & The Beast, They Dwell in the Depths
 Episode 12: Terror of the T-Gun, I Against A World, Bruce Banner is the Hulk
 Episode 13: The Man Called Boomerang, Hulk Intervenes, Less Than Monster, More Than Man

The Invincible Iron Man

 Episode 1: Double Disaster, Enter Happy Hogan, Of Ice and Men
 Episode 2: The Death of Tony Stark!, The Hands of the Mandarin, The Origin of The Mandarin
 Episode 3: Ultimo, Ultimo Lives, Crescendo
 Episode 4: The Mandarin's Revenge!, The Mandarin's Death Ray, No One Escapes the Mandarin
 Episode 5: Crimson Dynamo!, The Crimson Dynamo Strikes, Captured
 Episode 6: Enter Hawkeye, So Spins the Web, Triple Jeopardy
 Episode 7: If I Die, Let It Be With Honor, Fight On, For A World Is Watching, What Price Victory?
 Episode 8: The Moleman Strikes, The Dragon of the Flames, Decision Under the Earth
 Episode 9: The Other Iron Man!, Death Duel, Into The Jaws of the Death
 Episode 10: The Cliffs of Doom!, The False Captain America, The Unmasking
 Episode 11: My Life For Yours, The Black Knight's Gambit, The Menace of the Monster
 Episode 12: The Dream Master, If A Man Be Mad, Duel In Space
 Episode 13: Beauty and the Armor, Peril in Space, As A City Watches

The Mighty Thor

 Episode 1: Trapped by Loki, The Vengeance of Loki, The Defeat of Loki
 Episode 2: Chained Evil, Sandu, Master of the Supernatural, Enchanted Hammer
 Episode 3: Enchantress and Executioner, Giants Walk the Earth, Battle of the Gods
 Episode 4: At the Mercy of Loki, Trial of the Gods, Return To Earth
 Episode 5: The Absorbing Man, In My Hands, This Hammer, Vengeance of the Thunder God
 Episode 6: To Kill A Thunder God, The Day of the Destroyer, Terror of the Tomb
 Episode 7: The Grey Gargoyle, The Wrath of Odin, Triumph in Stone
 Episode 8: The Mysterious Mister Hyde, Revenge of Mr. Hyde, Thor's Showdown with Mr. Hyde
 Episode 9: Every Hand Against Him, The Power of the Thunder God, The Power of Odin
 Episode 10: The Tomorrow Man, Return of Zarrko, Slave of Tomorrow Man
 Episode 11: Enter Hercules, When Meet Immortals, Whom the Gods Would Destroy
 Episode 12: The Power of Pluto, The Verdict of Zeus, Thunder in the Netherworld
 Episode 13: Molto, the Lava Man, Invasion of the Lava Man, Living Rock

Prince Namor the Sub-Mariner

 Episode 1: Peril in the Surface World, So Spreads the Net, The Unveiling
 Episode 2: The Start of the Quest!, Escape to Nowhere, A Prince There Was
 Episode 3: Not All My Power Can Save Me!, When Fails the Quest, The End of the Quest
 Episode 4: Atlantis Under Attack, The Sands of Terror, The Iron Idol of Infamy
 Episode 5: The Thing from Space, No Escape for Namor, A Prince Dies Fighting
 Episode 6: To Conquer a Crown, A Prince No More, He Who Wears the Crown
 Episode 7: To Walk Amongst Men!, When Rises the Behemoth, To the Death
 Episode 8: The World Within!, Atlantis Is Doomed, Quest for X-Atom
 Episode 9: Beware the Siren Song, Spell of Lorelei, Return of the Mud Beast
 Episode 10: Ship of Doom, Fall of Atlantis, Forces of Vengeance
 Episode 11: The Planet of Doom, To Test a Prince, To Save a Planet
 Episode 12: Dr. Doom's Day, The Doomed Allegiance, Tug of Death
 Episode 13: Let the Stranger Die..!, To Destroy a Tyrant, Save A City

Home media

Segments of the series appear on at least two VHS home video releases, containing three videocassettes each: Marvel Superheroes: Triple Pack #1 (UPC #024543004127) and Marvel's Mightiest Heroes: Triple Pack #2. Fox Video released a version titled Marvel's Mightiest Super Heroes Gift Set (EAN #0024543004134).

In 2003, Hulk segments giving his origin story appeared as an extra on the Buena Vista Home Entertainment DVD release of the 1996 animated television series The Incredible Hulk.

In September 2004, Buena Vista Home Entertainment announced plans to release The Marvel Superheroes Show on June 28, 2005, as a five-DVD set titled The 60's Superheroes. By February 2005, however, the release was off the schedule.

United Kingdom
In 2004, Maximum Entertainment released two four-disc boxsets which each contained one disc for the Captain America, Iron Man, Sub-Mariner and Thor. Both boxsets made up all the respective segments from the series. On May 21, 2007, Maximum re-released each of the respective segments on separate two-disc sets, with each episode re-edited into continuous, half-hour segments.

In April 2008, Liberation Entertainment acquired DVD rights to select Marvel shows from Jetix Europe for certain European territories and on August 25, 2008, released a two-disc set of the Hulk segments, re-edited into 13 20-minute episodes.

References

External links

 
 
 
 
 
 

1960s American animated television series
1960s American anthology television series
1966 American television series debuts
1966 American television series endings
American children's animated action television series
American children's animated adventure television series
American children's animated anthology television series
American children's animated superhero television series
Captain America television series
Animated television series based on Marvel Comics
First-run syndicated television programs in the United States
Hulk (comics) television series
Iron Man television series
Thor (Marvel Comics) in other media
Television shows based on Marvel Comics
Television series by Disney–ABC Domestic Television
Television series by Famous Studios
Television series by Grantray-Lawrence Animation
Television series by Saban Entertainment